Salyer Lake is a reservoir in Caddo County, Oklahoma at an elevation of 1,453 feet.  It is about 17 miles west of Minco, Oklahoma on SH-37 and SH-152.
The lake is about 6 acres in size.  Available fish species include Largemouth bass.

The short creek on which the reservoir is located flows south-southwest to become a tributary of White Bread Creek, which originates northwest of the lake and flows south and then south-southwest.  White Bread Creek later becomes a tributary of Sugar Creek northwest of Gracemont, Oklahoma, which in turn continues south-southeast to be become a tributary of the Washita River.

References

External links
 Salyer Lake

Caddo County, Oklahoma
Reservoirs in Oklahoma